James Gerald Murray (born 27 December 1958) is a Scottish retired professional footballer who played as a left back in the Football League for Cambridge United, Brentford and Sunderland. He was described by Cambridge News as "one of the greatest left backs to have featured" for Cambridge United.

Career

Cambridge United 
A full back, Murray joined Fourth Division club Cambridge United from non-League club Rivet Sports in September 1976. He quickly became an important player in the club's rise from the Fourth to the Second Division and made 147 consecutive appearances between 1980 and his departure in 1984. As of November 2014, Murray is 11th on Cambridge United's record-appearances list.

Sunderland (loan) 
In March 1984, Murray joined First Division club Sunderland on loan with a view to a permanent move. He made just one appearance, in a 1–1 draw with Tottenham Hotspur on 7 April, before returning to the Abbey Stadium.

Brentford 
Murray joined Third Division club Brentford for a £30,000 fee in July 1984. He was an ever-present during the 1984–85 season and missed just one match in 1985–86. He continued his virtual ever-present status through the 1986–87 season, before departing Griffin Park in September 1987. Murray made 166 appearances and scored four goals in just over three years with Brentford.

Return to Cambridge United 
In September 1987, Murray returned to Cambridge United for a £5,000 fee. Now playing in the Fourth Division, he appeared sparingly and left at the end of the 1987–88 season.

Soham Town Rangers 
Murray closed out his career with a spell at Eastern Counties League club Soham Town Rangers.

Coaching career 
Murray briefly served as assistant to Steve Fallon at Histon during the 2000s.

Personal life 
Murray's son Antonio is semi-professional footballer.

Career statistics

References

Scottish footballers
Cambridge United F.C. players
Sunderland A.F.C. players
Brentford F.C. players
Soham Town Rangers F.C. players
Living people
1958 births
Association football fullbacks
English Football League players
Footballers from Ayr